Gérard Dubois is a Swiss-born chef and businessman, focusing on patisseries, boulangeries and confiseries.  In 1991, Dubois opened the first La Rose Noire patisserie in Pacific Place, Admiralty, Hong Kong.

La Rose Noire has produced several publications – in 2003, 2006 and 2011. The latest edition Crafted Passion (2011) was awarded 'Best Dessert Book in the World,' from the Gourmand Awards in Paris. He has also been a regular panel judge at renowned international competitions.

His latest venture Passion by Gerard Dubois is a patisserie, boulangerie and confiserie in Wan Chai, Hong Kong.

References

External links
Larosenoire.com
Gourmand Awards Winners 2011
Passionbygd.com

Swiss chefs
Year of birth missing (living people)
Living people
Swiss businesspeople